Machhapuchchhre Bank Limited registered in 1998 as the first regional commercial bank from the western region of Nepal. The 'A' class commercial bank started its banking operations from its own head office located in the foothills of Mount Machhapuchchhre in the town of Pokhara since year 2000.

Network
Machhapuchchhre Bank Limited With 165 Branch Offices, 130 Branchless Banking Units, 8 Extension Counters and 206 ATMs spread all across the country, MBL is one of the full-fledged national level commercial banks operating in Nepal.

See also
 List of banks in Nepal

References

Banks of Nepal
1998 establishments in Nepal